Kathryn Fox (born 1966) is an Australian writer, public speaker, and medical practitioner. She is one of Australia's most popular authors. Her Anya Crichton series of crime novels has received multiple awards, nominations and international acclaim. In 2015, she followed up with Private Sydney, a thriller co-written with the world's best-selling author, James Patterson.

A passionate advocate for health and literacy, she started up the 'Read For Life' charity which provides education for underprivileged Indigenous children around Australia.

Life and work 

Fox is a Fellow of the Royal Australian College of General Practitioners with a special interest in forensic medicine. After 12 years, she ceased medical practice to concentrate on writing.

Her crime novels feature forensic pathologist Anya Crichton as the main protagonist. She is also working on a screenplay and a TV series.

Fox lives in Sydney and, aside from her writing and medical careers, is the patron of a reading programme for remote and Indigenous communities that promotes the links between literacy and health.

Novels
 Malicious Intent (2004)
 Without Consent (2006)
 Skin and Bone (2007)
 Blood Born (2009)
 Death Mask (2010)
 Cold Grave (2012)
 Fatal Impact (2014)
 Private Sydney (2015), co-written with James Patterson

Awards
 2005 shortlisted Ned Kelly Awards for Crime Writing — Best First Novel - Malicious Intent
 2005 winner Davitt Awards for Crime Writing — Best Adult Novel - Malicious Intent
 2010 shortlisted Davitt Awards — Best Adult Crime Novel - Blood Born
 2013 shortlisted Davitt Awards — Best Adult Crime Novel - Cold Grave
 2014 shortlisted Ned Kelly Awards for Crime Writing — Best Novel - Fatal Impact

Interviews
 The Age 9 February 2008 
 Booktopia 1 November 2010 
 First Tuesday Book Club

References

1966 births
Living people
Australian women novelists
Australian crime writers
21st-century Australian novelists
21st-century Australian women writers
Women crime writers